Cora is a chain of hypermarkets owned by Louis Delhaize Group in France, Belgium, Luxembourg, the French overseas territory of Mayotte and Romania. Cora was founded in 1974 by the supermarket holding Louis Delhaize Group after taking over three Carrefour hypermarkets located in Belgium. These three were originally established around 1969 as a joint venture franchise between two other companies: the Carrefour Group and the Delhaize Group.

The Louis Delhaize Group also includes the supermarket chain Match, the online supermarket Houra, the Truffaut garden center chain and the Animalis pet shop chain.
The name 'Cora' is borrowed from the Greek goddess Persephone (Roman: Proserpina) who is also known as Cora.

Operations around the world

References

External links
 Cora France
 Cora Belgium
 Cora Romania
 Cora Luxembourg

Supermarkets of Belgium
Hypermarkets of France
Supermarkets of Romania
Retail companies established in 1974
Retail companies of Belgium
Belgian companies established in 1974